Piia Suomalainen (born 9 July 1984) is a Finnish tennis player.

Suomalainen has won five singles and five doubles titles on the ITF Women's Circuit. On 10 October 2011, she reached her best singles ranking of world No. 356. On 15 January 2007, she peaked at No. 524 in the doubles rankings.

Since her debut for the Finland Fed Cup team in 2002, Suomalainen has a 37–33 record in Fed Cup competition.

ITF finals (10–11)

Singles (5–8)

Doubles (5–3)

External links
 
 
 

1984 births
Living people
Sportspeople from Helsinki
Finnish female tennis players
20th-century Finnish women
21st-century Finnish women